Peter Thompson (27 November 1942 Carlisle – 30 December 2018) was an English professional footballer. Thompson was known for his speedy and electric style of play.

Thompson made 560 appearances in the English Football League, playing for Preston North End F.C., Liverpool F.C. and the Bolton Wanderers. Thompson played as an outside left for Liverpool , and was capped 16 times for England.

Life and career

Preston North End

Thompson started his football career playing for the Petteril Bank Primary School before moving to Harraby Secondary school in Carlisle.  He played inside forward for England.  On graduation, Thompson was recruited by 17 professional football clubs.  He decided to join Preston North End F.C.

At Preston, Thompson became a regular First division player at age 17, making his debut against Arsenal F.C. on 30 August 1960.  In describing Thompson, Chairman Nat Buck said. "I've lost the number of clubs who want him, but how could we sell?" Preston even turned down a bid from Juventus.

Bill Shankly had been impressed by the speed and trickery of the young winger during a marathon 5th round FA cup tie between Liverpool F.C. and Preston in February 1962.  It went to a second replay at Old Trafford before the deadlock was finally broken by Thompson.

In 1961, after 121 League games and 20 League goals for Preston and relegation to 2nd Division, Thompson moved to Liverpool for £37,000.

Liverpool

Arriving at Liverpool, Thompson went into the first-team.  He played in all 42 League games that first season, winning a championship medal as Liverpool won the title by four points. The team won three trophies in the mid-60's, winning another championship medal in 1966.  Thompson participate in Liverpool's FA Cup victory in 1965. He came to Alf Ramsey's attention and won 16 caps.

in 1966 and again in 1970 Thompson was named to the initial World Cup squad of 28 players, but did not make the final squad. As a member of the initial England squad ahead of the 1970 FIFA World Cup, Thompson was involved in the Bogotá Bracelet incident. By some accounts, he was in or near the jewellery shop when Bobby Moore allegedly stole a bracelet.

He started the 1970–71 season in the first-team and played in the opening 16 league matches. He was not a regular starter during the second half of the season although he did come off the bench to replace Alun Evans in the 1971 FA Cup final against Arsenal. He immediately helped to provide Steve Heighway with the opener before losing 2-1 after extra time.

Bolton Wanderers
Suffering from knee problems in 1973 and relegated to the Liverpool reserves, Thompson contemplated retirement.  However, Jimmy Armfield, manager of Bolton F.C, . persuaded Thompson to go on loan to Bolton in December 1973.  In January 1974, Thompson signed with Bolton for £18,000..

Thompson retired in April 1978 after having played 132 matches for Bolton, who were promoted that season to the top-flight.

After football
After retiring in 1978, Thompson ran a caravan park for seven years in Knott End-on-Sea in Lancashire.  He then ran hotels in the Lake District and Harrogate. In 2006, Thompson moved to Portugal.

Thompson died on 30 December 2018, aged 76.

Honours
Preston North End
 FA Youth Cup runners-up: 1959-60

Liverpool
 First Division champions: 1963–64, 1965–66
 First Division runners-up: 1968–69
 FA Cup winners: 1964-65
 FA Cup runners-up: 1970-71
 European Cup Winners' Cup runners-up: 1965-66
 Charity Shield winners: 1964 (shared), 1965, 1966

Bolton Wanderers
 Second Division champions: 1977–78

References

External links
Player profile at LFChistory.net
Stats and photo at Sporting Heroes

1942 births
2018 deaths
Footballers from Carlisle, Cumbria
English footballers
England international footballers
England under-23 international footballers
Association football wingers
Preston North End F.C. players
Liverpool F.C. players
Bolton Wanderers F.C. players
English Football League players
UEFA Euro 1968 players
English Football League representative players
FA Cup Final players